Stuart Alden Cook (born April 25, 1945) is an American bass guitarist, best known for his work in the rock band Creedence Clearwater Revival (CCR), for which he is a member of the Rock and Roll Hall of Fame.

Career
Cook, along with Doug Clifford and brothers Tom and John Fogerty, grew up in El Cerrito, California, where all four attended El Cerrito High School. Cook, Clifford and John Fogerty formed a band in high school which eventually became Creedence Clearwater Revival after Tom joined.

In the mid-1970s, following the breakup of CCR, Cook and Clifford joined the Don Harrison Band, which released two albums.

In 1979, Cook produced 15 songs by Roky Erickson and the Aliens, which were released in 1980 on two LPs with different running orders, The Evil One and I Think of Demons.

From 1986 to 1991, Cook was a member of the country band Southern Pacific. With Southern Pacific, Cook covered the Erickson song "It's a Cold Night for Alligators" for the tribute album Where the Pyramid Meets the Eye: A Tribute to Roky Erickson.

Cook was inducted into the Rock and Roll Hall of Fame in 1993. Also in 1993, Cook auditioned for the role of the bassist in The Rolling Stones after the departure of Bill Wyman. Cook later reunited with Clifford, forming the band Creedence Clearwater Revisited in 1995.

Discography

Don Harrison Band
The Don Harrison Band (1976)
Red Hot (1977)

Roky Erickson and the Aliens
Roky Erickson and the Aliens (1980)
The Evil One (1981)

Southern Pacific
Killbilly Hill (1986)
Zuma (1988)
County Line (1990)
Greatest Hits (1991)

Creedence Clearwater Revisited
Recollection (1998)

Stu Cook / Keith Knudsen / John McFee
Jackdawg (2009; recorded 1990)

Other appearances

References

External links
Creedence Clearwater Revisited (Official Site)

1945 births
Living people
American bass guitarists
Creedence Clearwater Revisited members
Creedence Clearwater Revival members
Musicians from Oakland, California
Guitarists from California
20th-century American guitarists